Okinawan may refer to:
 Something of or relating to:
 Okinawa Island
 Okinawa Islands
 Okinawa Prefecture
 Okinawan language, an endangered language spoken by the people of Okinawa Island
 Okinawan people, a subgroup of the Ryukyuan people
 Okinawan cuisine

See also
 Okinawa (disambiguation)
 Ryukyuan (disambiguation)

Language and nationality disambiguation pages